Truth Over Magnitude is the third studio album by Austrian pop singer Conchita Wurst. It was released on 25 October 2019 by Sony Music Entertainment. The album includes the singles "Trash All the Glam", "Hit Me", "See Me Now", "To the Beat", "Forward" and "Under the Gun".

Critical reception
Jonathan Vautrey of Wiwibloggs, gave the album a positive review stating, "Musically, there’s a reservedness and quietness running throughout the twelve-track LP. There’s no extremely upbeat song or big soaring power ballad where WURST tries to make an over-produced statement. Rather, Truth Over Magnitude subtly delivers a message of self-love and respect. WURST’s new LP may not be everyone’s musical cup of tea. But, the Eurovision alum is not here to make a big splash and release records that try to appeal to the masses. Instead, Tom Neuwirth favours truth over magnitude, and humbly bares the current state of his soul through T.O.M." Luke Malam of ESCXtra also gave the album a positive review, stating, "This new album from WURST features a more electronic sound than the releases of Conchita and may come as a surprise to some. The story behind the album is one of evolution, and of Tom’s journey changing from the Conchita we first saw in 2011 (as part of ORF’s Die große Chance) to the WURST we see today! The album is a huge statement, WURST is doing what he wants and what he finds fun, regardless of what others may think. Forget Conchita, and “See Me Now” as he says, for the artist that he has become!"

Track listing

Charts

References

Conchita Wurst albums
Sony Music albums
2019 albums